Bornova Belediyespor is a basketball club based in Bornova district of İzmir, Turkey that plays in the Turkish Basketball First League (TBL) since 2009–2010 season.  Their home arena is the İzmir Halkapınar Sport Hall.

External links
Fan Page  
Facebook 
TBL Website 
TBLStat.net Profile 

Basketball teams in Turkey
Turkish Basketball Super League teams
1986 establishments in Turkey
Basketball teams established in 1986